Józef Zagor (born 16 November 1940) is a Polish equestrian. He was born in Derło. He competed in dressage at the 1980 Summer Olympics in Moscow, where he placed fourth in the team competition and tenth in the individual dressage.

References

External links

1940 births
Living people
People from Biała Podlaska County
Polish male equestrians
Polish dressage riders
Olympic equestrians of Poland
Equestrians at the 1980 Summer Olympics
Sportspeople from Lublin Voivodeship